Fredrikstad Idrettsforening is a Norwegian athletics club from Fredrikstad, founded on 4 September 1896.

As a stadium the club uses the Sentralidrettsanlegget in Lisleby, a borough of Fredrikstad. They hosted the Norwegian athletics championships in 2003.

Its most prominent members are Mette Bergmann and Tor Øivind Ødegård.

External links
 Official site

Athletics clubs in Norway
Sport in Fredrikstad
Sports clubs established in 1896
1896 establishments in Norway